Luis Horna and Juan Mónaco were the defending champions, but Horna chose not to participate, and only Mónaco competed that year.Mónaco partnered with Agustín Calleri, but lost in the quarterfinals to Paul Hanley and Jordan Kerr.

Martin Damm and Robert Lindstedt won in the final, 7–5, 6–4, against Scott Lipsky and Leander Paes.

Seeds

Draw

Draw

External links
Draw

Doubles